Kevin Burns (born March 26, 1985) is an American soccer player who most recently played for Carolina RailHawks in the North American Soccer League.

Career

College and Amateur
Burns played college soccer at the University of Connecticut from 2003 to 2006. During the 2003 and 2004 collegiate off seasons, he played for the Bradenton Academics in the fourth division USL Premier Development League; in 2006, he played for the Westchester Flames.

Professional
Burns was drafted in the fourth round (50th overall) by Columbus Crew in the 2007 MLS Supplemental Draft., but instead of signing with Columbus he spent the 2007 season with the Rochester Raging Rhinos in the USL First Division. Burns eventually signed with Columbus for the 2008 season, but sat out the season with an ankle injury.

After the 2008 dissolution of the reserve league, Burns was initially waived but was re-signed just prior to the beginning of the 2009 season. To make room, Columbus cut goalkeeper Kenny Schoeni.

Burns made his MLS debut on May 27, 2009, as 69th-minute substitute for Brian Carroll in a game against the San Jose Earthquakes.

Burns remained with Columbus through the 2011 season. At season's end, the club declined his 2012 contract option and he entered the 2011 MLS Re-Entry Draft. Burns was not selected in the draft and became a free agent.

References

External links 

Rochester Rhinos bio

1985 births
Living people
American soccer players
UConn Huskies men's soccer players
IMG Academy Bradenton players
Westchester Flames players
Rochester New York FC players
Columbus Crew players
North Carolina FC players
Soccer players from Indiana
USL League Two players
USL First Division players
Major League Soccer players
Columbus Crew draft picks
Association football midfielders